The 1498 Meiō earthquake (明応地震 Meiō Jishin) occurred off the coast of Nankaidō, Japan, at about 08:00 local time on 20 September 1498. It had a magnitude estimated at 8.6  and triggered a large tsunami. The death toll associated with this event is uncertain, but between 5,000 and 41,000 casualties were reported. The tsunami caused by the Meiō Nankaidō earthquake washed away the building housing the statue of the Great Buddha at Kōtoku-in in Kamakura, although the statue itself remained intact.

Tectonic setting
The southern coast of Honshū runs parallel to the Nankai Trough, which marks the subduction of the Philippine Sea Plate beneath the Eurasian Plate. Movement on this convergent plate boundary leads to many earthquakes, some of them of megathrust type. The Nankai megathrust has five distinct segments (A-E) that can rupture independently, the segments have ruptured either singly or together repeatedly over the last 1,300 years. 

Megathrust earthquakes on this structure tend to occur in pairs, with a relatively short time gap between them. In addition to the two events in 1854, there were similar earthquakes in 1944 and 1946. In each case, the northeastern segment ruptured before the southwestern segment. In the 1498 event, the earthquake is thought to have ruptured segments C, D and E and possibly A and B. If both parts of the megathrust ruptured, the events were either simultaneous, or close enough in time, to not be distinguished by historical sources.

Characteristics
Severe shaking caused by this earthquake was recorded from Bōsō Peninsula in the northeast to Kii Peninsula in the southwest. A tsunami was recorded in Suruga Bay and at Kamakura, where it destroyed the building housing the statue of the Great Buddha at Kōtoku-in, although the statue itself survived and has remained outdoors ever since. There is also evidence of severe shaking from records of ground liquefaction in the Nankai area. Tsunami deposits attributed to this earthquake have been described from the coastal plains around the Sagami Trough and the Izu Peninsula.

Uplift of the seafloor of up to 4 m has been estimated for this earthquake, with a much smaller subsidence near the coast. Lake Hamana became a brackish lake because the tsunami broke through low-lying land between the lake and the Pacific Ocean (Enshū Nada); this formed a channel to the sea, which still remains today.

See also

List of historical earthquakes
List of earthquakes in Japan

References

1498 in Asia
1490s in Japan
 Megathrust earthquakes in Japan
 Tsunamis in Japan
15th-century earthquakes